Kappa Kappa Kappa may refer to:
 Kappa Pi Kappa, a local, social fraternity at Dartmouth College known as Kappa Kappa Kappa for most of its history.
 Tri Kappa, a women's philanthropic organization based in Indiana